Bartlett v. Strickland, 556 U.S. 1 (2009), is a United States Supreme Court case in which a plurality of the Court held that a minority group must constitute a numerical majority of the voting-age population in an area before section 2 of the Voting Rights Act requires the creation of a legislative district to prevent dilution of that group's votes.

The decision struck down a North Carolina redistricting plan that attempted to preserve minority voting power in a 39% black North Carolina House of Representatives district.

Justice Kennedy delivered the decision and was joined by Justices Alito and Roberts. Justice Thomas filed a concurring opinion that was joined by Justice Scalia. Justice Souter filed a dissenting opinion that was joined by Justices Stevens, Ginsburg, and Breyer. Justices Ginsburg and Breyer also filed separate dissenting opinions.

See also 
 Thornburg v. Gingles,

External links 
 

United States Supreme Court cases
United States electoral redistricting case law
2009 in United States case law
North Carolina House of Representatives
United States Supreme Court cases of the Roberts Court